WBXG-LD, virtual and UHF digital channel 33, was a low-powered Sonlife-affiliated television station licensed to Gainesville, Florida, United States. The station was owned by L4 Media Group. The station's transmitter was located along SW 8th Avenue in west Gainesville.

History
WBXG-LD began operations on April 13, 1989, as W31AT, broadcasting on UHF channel 31. The station was originally an affiliate of The Box, a broadcast network where viewers could call-in to request (via a code) their favorite music video(s) be played, much like a call-in music radio station. The station later changed its call letters to WBXG-LP, which reflected its association with The Box network and the City of Gainesville.

In May 1999, The Box was acquired by MTV Networks division of Viacom and as a result, WBXG-LP became an affiliate of MTV2 when The Box was merged into that network's operations on January 1, 2001. About a year later, WBXG-LP upgraded to Class A as WBXG-CA and started broadcasting on channel 33.

By the early 2010s, Viacom had gradually sold most of their broadcast affiliates to other parties and in July 2015, WBXG dropped MTV2 and affiliated with Sonlife.

Digital television

Digital channels
The station's digital signal is multiplexed:

Analog-to-digital conversion
WBXG-CA shut down its analog signal to convert to digital in 2016 and changed its call letters to WBXG-LD on August 2 of that year.

Spectrum reallocation 
As part of the upcoming Spectrum reallocation, WBXG-LD in 2018 obtained a construction permit to move its digital signal to UHF channel 34. However, it was later canceled along with the station's licence on May 14, 2019.

See also
 Channel 33 low-power TV stations in the United States

References

External links
 http://www.sonlifetv.com/index.html
 https://transition.fcc.gov/fcc-bin/tvq?facid=70413

Television channels and stations established in 1990
BXG-LD
Low-power television stations in the United States
1990 establishments in Florida
Defunct television stations in the United States
Television channels and stations disestablished in 2019
2019 disestablishments in Florida
BXG-LD